Eglė Raznauskaitė (born 16 September 1997) is a Lithuanian footballer who plays as a midfielder for Jonava. She has been a member of the Lithuania women's national team.

References

1997 births
Living people
Women's association football midfielders
Lithuanian women's footballers
Lithuania women's international footballers